Resolution Island is one of the many uninhabited Canadian Arctic islands in Qikiqtaaluk Region, Nunavut. It is a Baffin Island offshore island located in Davis Strait. The Lower Savage Islands lie between Resolution Island and Baffin Island, while Graves Strait separates Resolution Island from the more northern Edgell Island.

History
English explorer Martin Frobisher landed on the island on July 28, 1576, while on a voyage to discover the fabled Northwest Passage. However it appears to have been named Resolution in 1612 by Sir Thomas Button, after his own ship, the Resolution.

The island was home to an American military base, now CFS Resolution Island, that became operational in 1954 as part of the Distant Early Warning (DEW) line. The base was vacated in 1973 and turned over to the Canadian government in 1974.

The Canadian cargo ship named "MINNA" was wrecked on the east side of the island, on 18 August 1974. The vessel was then under charter by the Bedford Institute of Oceanography and was doing scientific surveys at the time of the accident. Badly damaged, the ship's crew and scientific equipment were removed. Bad weather swept the vessel in deeper waters where she sank on October 2, 1974. This vessel with a length of 275 feet's and displacement of 4,280 tons was based in Halifax and was on regular charter with the BIO for hydrographic surveys on the Labrador Coast and Hudson Strait. The MINNA was built in 1962 and had a crew of 21 men and 18 scientists.

It was during site investigations between 1987 and 1990 that contamination at the site was first discovered. The contamination originates largely from spills from the radar equipment, which used polychlorinated biphenyls (PCBs) as insulators. Other pollutants include unused transformer fluids, hydrocarbons, asbestos and heavy metals in the buildings and sprinkled throughout the site. Resolution Island has been identified as having the highest level of PCB contamination of all former military sites that fall under Indian and Northern Affairs Canada’s (INAC) responsibility in the North.

In 1993 and 1994, an environmental site assessment of the area was completed. As a result, temporary barriers were placed across drainage paths to stop the migration of PCBs into the water. Further investigations were done and, in 1997, INAC initiated remediation work with Qikiqtaaluk Corporation (QC). A large-scale remediation plan was developed, in cooperation with Environment and Climate Change Canada, QC and Queen's University. Steps were taken at that time to ensure that the contaminants were not posing a risk to humans and wildlife.

References

Islands of Baffin Island
Islands of Hudson Strait
Uninhabited islands of Qikiqtaaluk Region
Former populated places in the Qikiqtaaluk Region